William Henry "Doc" Shideler (born July 14, 1886 in West Middletown, Ohio and died December 18, 1958 in Oxford, Ohio) was an American geologist who was founder and longtime chair of the department of geology at Miami University and was a founder of the national college fraternity, Phi Kappa Tau.

Early life and education

His family moved to Hamilton, Ohio, when he was quite young. In 1904 he graduated from Hamilton High School and entered Miami University in September of that year.  At Miami, he was a member of the varsity track team as a distance runner and was an organizer and member of the nonfraternity intramural teams, whose activities became important to the founding of the Non-Fraternity Association, precursor to Phi Kappa Tau. "Doc" (as he was known from undergraduate days on) was a member of the Erodelphian Literary Society and chaired the Athletic Board of Control in his final year. A member of the campus Democratic Club, he was an outspoken progressive as an undergraduate. Shideler completed his undergraduate work in three years receiving his Bachelor of Arts degree with the class of 1907. He earned his Ph.D. in geology at Cornell University in 1910 under the direction of the eminent biostratigrapher and student of Louis Agassiz, Henry Shaler Williams.

Academic career

Shideler was invited to join Miami beginning in 1910 as a member of the zoology faculty. In this capacity, he taught courses in general geology, paleontology, and organic evolution. He persuaded the Miami administration in 1920 to establish a geology department, which he chaired for thirty-six years. As a paleontologist, he became an expert on the Upper Ordovician fossils and stratigraphy that are revealed in the out croppings and creek beds around Oxford, Ohio. In geology circles, Shideler was well known for his fossil collections, occasional publications, and professional activities. Scholars from around the world came to Miami to consult with him and study the specimens he collected. Though he was not a prolific writer, Shideler freely shared information and research, which led to many scholarly publications and Ph. D. theses. He amassed an outstanding collection of type specimens and Upper Ordovician materials for Miami. Thirteen species, three genera, one family, and one mountain (Mount Shideler) in Antarctica were named for him as "a geologist's way of passing a compliment," he once said. He was a fellow of the American Academy of Arts and Sciences and the Ohio Academy of Science and served as president of the Ohio Academy in 1951.  He was a member of Phi Beta Kappa, Sigma Xi, Phi Sigma, Sigma Gamma Epsilon (served as national vice president for 19 years), Omicron Delta Kappa and the Geology Society of America and he was past president of the American Geology Teachers organization.

He served as Miami University's representative to the NCAA and was chairman of the Mid-American Conference.

Fraternity involvement
In Phi Kappa Tau, Shideler held almost every national office, including a term as national president in 1913-14. He was instrumental in bringing the fraternity's National Headquarters to Oxford in 1930, and the fraternity's national office was within a block of his home and campus office. The Shidelers lived in a historic Oxford home that had belonged to David Swing and was later used in filming the Jodie Foster movie Little Man Tate.  Phi Kappa Tau's highest undergraduate award has been known as the Shideler Award and has been presented to the fraternity's outstanding graduating senior since 1938.

Retirement and legacy
He deferred his retirement from Miami three times, finally giving up the chairmanship of his department in 1956. When he retired the following year, he was the recipient of a John Hay Whitney Foundation grant to go to Hiram College to start a geology program there, much as he had done for Miami in 1920. He was professor of Geology at Hiram in 1957-58.

In 1967 Miami University named its new earth-science building William H. Shideler Hall in his memory.  The Karl Limper Geology Museum in Shideler Hall has as its basis the huge collection of specimens amassed by Dr. Shideler.   He is buried in the Miami University plot of the Oxford Cemetery, next to his wife, Katherine Hoffman Shideler.

The Shidelers had two sons, James Henry Shideler, a noted professor of history at the University of California-Davis, and William Watson Shideler.

References

 Anson, Jack L., The Golden Jubilee History of Phi Kappa Tau, Lawhead Press, Athens Ohio: 1957
 Ball, Charles T., From Old Main to a New Century: A History of Phi Kappa Tau, Heritage Publishers, Phoenix: 1996

External links

1886 births
1958 deaths
Cornell University College of Agriculture and Life Sciences alumni
Miami University alumni
People from Middletown, Ohio
20th-century American geologists
Miami University faculty
Hiram College faculty
Phi Kappa Tau founders
Burials at Oxford Cemetery, Oxford, Ohio
Fellows of the American Academy of Arts and Sciences